Christopher Mark Chandler (born October 12, 1965) is an American former professional football player who was a quarterback in the National Football League (NFL) for 17 seasons. He played for seven different teams in eight different cities during his NFL career, and is known for leading the Atlanta Falcons to a 14–2 season in 1998 followed by an appearance in Super Bowl XXXIII.

Early years
Chandler was born on October 12, 1965, in Everett, Washington, the ninth of ten children. His mother died when he was 19, and his father died shortly after he made it to the NFL. In high school, he was active in basketball, football, track and golf. As a high school quarterback, Chandler threw for 2,000 yards and 49 touchdowns.

In college, Chandler played at the University of Washington from 1984 to 1987. He finished third in the school's history in total offense with 4,442 yards and 32 touchdown passes, and ended his college career as the Offensive Player of the Game at the 1988 Senior Bowl. He graduated with an economics degree.

College statistics

Professional career
Chandler played in the NFL for 17 seasons, from 1988 to 2004. He played for eight teams (seven franchises as he played for Los Angeles Rams in their original city and later when they relocated to St. Louis), a record shared with Ryan Fitzpatrick, Mark Royals, Karl Wilson, and Jeff Brady, although Chandler and Fitzpatrick are the only two to have started for eight different teams. He threw for 28,484 yards, and had a career passer rating of 79.1. He has thrown at least one touchdown pass for seven different franchises, an NFL record before it was broken by Fitzpatrick in 2019. At the time of his retirement, he was ranked 30th in all-time pass completions, with 2328.

Chandler was continually bothered by injuries which earned him the moniker of "Crystal Chandelier" amongst his detractors. He also had the misfortune of "always [being] the guy preceding the next great draft choice" which made his career somewhat of a journeyman's.

1988–1996
Chandler was taken in the 3rd round of the draft by the Indianapolis Colts. The Colts deemed Chandler expendable due to his poor play, and the fact that they selected Jeff George with the first overall choice in the 1990 draft. Chandler was traded to the Tampa Bay Buccaneers in 1990 for a 1st round draft choice that turned out to be the 2nd overall pick. The Colts also had the 1st pick the same year. The pick that they got for Chandler they used on Quentin Coryatt. Chandler was cut during the 1991 season. As a Buccaneer, he had an 0–6 record as a starter, threw for 5 touchdowns and 14 interceptions, and had a passer rating of 44.9.

From 1992 to 1994 he played reasonably well as a starter and backup for the Phoenix Cardinals and the Los Angeles Rams. After joining the Houston Oilers in 1995, he would earn the starting job. His highlight with the team came on September 24, 1995 at Cincinnati. In the Oilers' 38–28 victory Chandler threw for 352 yards and 4 touchdowns, and earned a perfect passer rating of 158.3 after completing 23 of 26 passes. However, late in 1996, Jeff Fisher decided that Steve McNair was ready to start, and Chandler was traded to the Atlanta Falcons for a fourth-round draft choice.

1997–2001
Chandler's best seasons were with Atlanta, when he was coached by Dan Reeves. The Falcon's financial constraints meant that they could not sign an expensive big-name quarterback from free agency. Chandler was a Pro Bowl quarterback in 1997 and 1998. Reeves said Chandler "makes decisions while backpedaling that other QBs can't make until they settle into the pocket" while other "Coaches say he can speed-read defenses and anticipate his receivers well". In 1998, Chandler's 9.65 yards-per-attempt figure was the highest single-season YPA of any quarterback in the 1990s with 300+ passing attempts, while he set career-bests in yardage and touchdowns and threw just 12 interceptions. The 1998 season saw Chandler lead the Falcons to a 14–2 record, winning their first playoff game in the Georgia Dome by overcoming the San Francisco 49ers and Steve Young 20–18 in the divisional round, and then capturing the NFC Championship conference title by upsetting the 15–1 Minnesota Vikings to make their inaugural appearance in the Super Bowl. In Super Bowl XXXIII, Chandler's Falcons lost to the defending champions Denver Broncos quarterbacked by John Elway and coached by Mike Shanahan. Although Chandler had a higher passing efficiency rating that season than future Hall-of-Famer Elway, Chandler put in a disappointing performance in the Super Bowl with 219 yards with one touchdown and three interceptions while being sacked three times.

Chandler signed a five-year, $27 million contract with the Falcons after the Super Bowl. Following the 2000 season, Chandler's record as a starting Atlanta quarterback was 28–25, which prompted the Falcons to consider recruiting a new quarterback. Atlanta held the fifth overall pick in the 2001 draft, and traded the pick to the San Diego Chargers, along with Tim Dwight, a third round pick in 2001, and a 2002 second round pick (which became Reche Caldwell). In return, Atlanta received the first overall pick in the 2001 draft, which they used to select quarterback Michael Vick. Still, Chandler started most of the 2001 season and finished with 2,847 passing yards, the second highest of his career. In 2002, he was replaced by Vick as the starting quarterback. Due to mediocre play, bloated salary, and being replaced by Vick, the Falcons opted to make Chandler eligible for selection by the Houston Texans in the 2002 Expansion Draft, with hopes of Chandler being picked up by the new team. Chandler left the Falcons ranked third in team history with 13,268 passing yards, but never achieved back-to-back winning seasons.

2002–2004
In 2002, Chandler was picked up by the Chicago Bears, and spent two seasons there before being released.

Chandler then agreed to a three-year $2.6 million contract to rejoin the Rams, who had moved to St. Louis, to serve as a backup and mentor to Marc Bulger, who had recently displaced Kurt Warner as the starting quarterback. In Chandler's first start as a Ram in 2004, he threw six interceptions, a team record. The following week, his poor play led to head coach Mike Martz saying, "It is tragic that, that position [when played by Chandler] holds this team hostage."
As a result, Chandler was the first Ram to be released in the off-season, saving St. Louis $665,000 in cap space.

NFL career statistics

Regular season

Postseason

Personal life
Chandler lived in San Diego and was married to Diane Brodie, a former college tennis player at USC and daughter of former San Francisco 49ers quarterback John Brodie; they married in 1994. They have three daughters: Ryann, Skye, and Brynn. As Chandler's mother Shirley died of breast cancer in 1984, and his father Forrest succumbed to lung cancer in 1991, Chandler has looked upon John Brodie and Jerry Rhome (who served as Chandler's quarterback coach in Arizona and Houston) as surrogate fathers and mentors.

Chandler is a regular competitor at the American Century Championship, the annual competition to determine the best golfers among American sports and entertainment celebrities. He won the tournament in 2007 and has a total of eight top ten finishes. Chris Chandler fired a 5 under par round of 67 scoring a total of 31 points. The veteran QB set both single day and tournament records for points with his final round play. The tournament, televised by NBC in July, is played at Edgewood Tahoe Golf Course in Lake Tahoe. Chandler helped coach the boys' golf team at Torrey Pines High School, where his oldest daughter Ryann plays on the volleyball team.

See also
 List of NFL quarterbacks who have posted a perfect passer rating
 Washington Huskies football statistical leaders

References

External links
 Stats at Pro-Football-Reference.com
 

1965 births
Living people
American football quarterbacks
Sportspeople from Everett, Washington
Players of American football from Washington (state)
Washington Huskies football players
Indianapolis Colts players
Tampa Bay Buccaneers players
Phoenix Cardinals players
Los Angeles Rams players
Houston Oilers players
Atlanta Falcons players
Chicago Bears players
St. Louis Rams players
National Conference Pro Bowl players